The Udaipur Solar Observatory (USO) is in Udaipur, Rajasthan in India on an island in the Fateh Sagar Lake. The sky conditions at Udaipur are quite favourable for solar observations. Since the observatory is situated amidst a large mass of water, air turbulence which occurs due to ground heating by sun's rays is decreased. This improves the image quality and accuracy (average between 1-2 arc seconds).

History
The observatory was built in 1976 by Dr. Arvind Bhatnagar following the model of the Solar Observatory at Big Bear lake in Southern California. Later, he was joined by Dr. Ashok Ambastha in 1983 and subsequently by many others at different stages who have continued further contributing to the growth of this observatory.

Telescopes
Utilizing a variety of telescopes, USO is known for its solar observations, which include high-resolution solar chromospheric, magnetic field, velocity, and spectral observations, for studies pertaining to solar flares, mass ejections, and the evolution of solar active regions. USO fills the large longitudinal gap between Australia and Spain, and provides a link for continuous solar coverage in international collaborative programs, including the Global Oscillations Network Group (GONG). Since 1981, USO has been managed by the Physical Research Laboratory, Ahmedabad, for the Department of Space, Government of India.

Multi Application Solar Telescope (MAST)
The Multi Application Solar Telescope (MAST) was operationalised on 4 August 2015. MAST is an off-axis Gregorian-Coude telescope with a 50 cm aperture to be used to study the Sun's magnetic field.

See also
List of solar telescopes

References

Astronomical observatories in Rajasthan
Astronomical observatories in India
Buildings and structures in Udaipur
Tourist attractions in Udaipur
Solar telescopes
1976 establishments in Rajasthan